Gymnetis stellata is a Mexican species of Gymnetis.

References

Cetoniinae
Beetles of North America